Babylon by Bus is a live album released by Bob Marley and the Wailers in 1978. The tracks on this album are considered, with two exceptions, to be from the Pavillon de Paris concerts over 3 nights, 25–27 June 1978, during the Kaya Tour, though there are discrepancies in the track listing.

Like the 1973 album Catch a Fire, the first release had something of a novelty cover. The windows of the bus on the front cover were cut out, revealing part of the inner sleeve. As this was a double album, the listener had a choice of four different scenes to view through the windows.

Set list
"Heathen", "Lively Up Yourself" and "Concrete Jungle" were not as common as the rest of the album on the tour, with 2 of the 3 more than likely played on any given night, but not always, and were only ever all played on the same night twice: at the Pinecrest Country Club in Shelton, Connecticut, 14 June and the Music Inn in Lenox, Massachusetts 18 June, which was one of the longest shows ever played by the band with 22 songs, but none were played at the Paris concerts. "Rebel Music", "Positive Vibration", "Jamming", "Exodus", "War / No More Trouble" and "Punky Reggae Party" were nearly always played at some point of each concert, though were mixed up some times with other songs like "Get Up, Stand Up", usually played with "Punky Reggae Party", which is not on this album though was also played most nights. The song "Is This Love" was also not common on this tour, though was played in Paris. The track "Kinky Reggae" was not played on the Kaya tour and in fact had not been played since the 1976 Rastaman Vibration tour, so it is unclear which concert this version is from.

Track listing

Original album (1978)

The Definitive Remasters edition (2001)

Personnel

Musicians
Bob Marley – lead vocals, rhythm guitar
Carlton Barrett – drums
Aston "Family Man" Barrett – bass
Tyrone "Organ D" Downie – keyboards
Junior Marvin – lead guitar
Alvin "Seeco" Patterson – percussion
Al Anderson – lead guitar
Earl "Wire" Lindo – keyboards
Rita Marley – backing vocals
Marcia Griffiths – backing vocals
Judy Mowatt – backing vocals

Production
Bob Marley and the Wailers – producer 
Chris Blackwell – producer
Jack Nuber – engineering mixer 
Neville Garrick – graphic art
Barry Diament, Rob Fraboni remastering audio engineer
Ted Jensen – mastering engineer

Charts

Certifications

References

Bob Marley and the Wailers live albums
1978 live albums
Albums produced by Chris Blackwell
Island Records live albums
Tuff Gong albums